Milesia semifulva is a species of hoverfly in the family Syrphidae.

Distribution
Myanmar, India, Java, Sumatra.

References

Insects described in 1904
Eristalinae
Diptera of Asia
Taxa named by Johannes C. H. de Meijere